Hucisko  is a village in the administrative district of Gmina Gdów, within Wieliczka County, Lesser Poland Voivodeship, in southern Poland.

Notable sites 
Tadeusz Kantor house - an original, wooden house, designed by Polish artists, Tadeusz Kantor.

Monument of A Chair - a permanent concrete installation from the "Impossible Monuments" series by Tadeusz Kantor. Erected posthumously in 1995 by Tadeusz Kantor Foundation.

A 1813 palace - listed in Registry of Objects of Cultural Heritage.

References

External links 
Tadeusz Kantor House and Monument of a Chair at Tadeusz Kantor Foundation website.

Hucisko